On Another Note is the second studio album by New Zealand musical trio Sol3 Mio. It was released on 9 October 2015 by Universal Music Group. The album debuted at number 1 on the New Zealand Albums Chart.

Track listing 
 "Stella"
 "Mamma"
 "That's Amore"
 "L'Alba Separa Dalla Luce L'Ombra"
 "I See Fire"
 "Shenandoah"
 "Santa Lucia"
 "Che Gelida Manina (From La Bohème)"
 "Jamaica Farewell"
 "Edelweiss"
 "Marechiare"
 "Volare"
 "Delilah"
 "Jerusalem"
 "Fix You" (Bonus Track)
 "Dance With My Father" (Bonus Track)

Charts and certifications

Weekly charts

Year-end charts

Certifications

See also
 New Zealand top 50 albums of 2015
 List of number-one albums from the 2010s (New Zealand)

References 

2015 albums
Universal Records albums
Sol3 Mio albums